Hydroxyethylmethacrylate (also known as glycol methyacrylate) is the organic compound with the chemical formula . It is a colorless viscous liquid that readily polymerizes. Hydroxyethylmethacrylate is a monomer that is used to make various polymers.

Synthesis
Hydroxyethylmethacrylate was first synthesized around 1925. Common methods of synthesis are:
 reaction of methacrylic acid with ethylene oxide;
 esterification of methacrylic acid with a large excess of ethylene glycol.
Both these methods give also some amount of ethylene glycol dimethacrylate. During polymerization of hydroxyethylmethacrylate, it works as crosslinking agent.

Properties
Hydroxyethylmethacrylate is completely miscible with water and ethanol, but its polymer is practically insoluble in common solvents. Its viscosity is 0.0701 Pa⋅s at 20°C and 0.005 Pa⋅s at 30°C. During polymerization, it shrinks by approximately 6%.

Applications

Contact lenses
In 1960, O. Wichterle and D. Lím described its use in synthesis of hydrophilic crosslinked networks, and these results had great importance for manufacture of soft contact lenses. Polyhydroxyethylmethacrylate is hydrophilic: it is capable of absorbing from 10 to 600% water relative to the dry weight. Because of this property, it was one of the first materials to be used in the manufacture of soft contact lenses.

Use in 3D printing
Hydroxyethylmethacrylate lends itself well to applications in 3D printing as it cures quickly at room temperature when exposed to UV light in the presence of photoinitiators.  It may be used as a monomeric matrix in which 40nm silica particles are suspended for 3D glass printing.  When combined with a suitable blowing agent such as BOC anhydride it forms a foaming resin which expands when heated.

Other
In electron microscopy, later in light microscopy, hydroxyethylmethacrylate serves as an embedding medium.

When treated with polyisocyanates, polyhydroxyethylmethacrylate makes a crosslinked polymer, an acrylic resin, that is a useful component in some paints.

Hazards
Hydroxyethylmethacrylate is a mild skin irritant and can cause allergic skin reactions.

References

Methacrylate esters
Monomers